β-Eudesmol synthase (EC 4.2.3.68) is an enzyme with systematic name (2E,6E)-farnesyl-diphosphate diphosphate-lyase (β-eudesmol-forming). This enzyme catalyses the following chemical reaction

 (2E,6E)-farnesyl diphosphate + H2O  β-eudesmol + diphosphate

The recombinant enzyme from ginger (Zingiber zerumbet) gives β-eudesmol, 10-epi-γ-eudesmol, α-eudesmol and aristolene.

References

External links 
 

EC 4.2.3